This is a bibliography of works about bacon, including cookbooks and history books.

Seduced by Bacon
Everything Tastes Better with Bacon
Bacon and Hams
Bacon: A Love Story
Snake 'n' Bacon
The Bacon Cookbook
The BLT Cookbook
I Love Bacon!

See also
Bacon mania
List of bacon dishes

References

Cookbooks
 
Bacon
Lists of books